George Elwood Smith (born May 10, 1930) is an American scientist, applied physicist, and co-inventor of the charge-coupled device (CCD). He was awarded a one-quarter share in the 2009 Nobel Prize in Physics for "the invention of an imaging semiconductor circuit—the CCD sensor, which has become an electronic eye in almost all areas of photography".

Early life
Smith was born in White Plains, New York.  Smith served in the US Navy, and subsequently obtained his B.Sc. degree from the University of Pennsylvania in 1955 and his Ph.D. degree from the University of Chicago in 1959 with a dissertation of only eight pages.

Career
He worked at Bell Labs in Murray Hill, New Jersey from 1959 to his retirement in 1986, where he led research into novel lasers and semiconductor devices.  During his tenure, Smith was awarded dozens of patents and eventually headed the VLSI device department.

In 1969, Smith and Willard Boyle invented the Charge-Coupled Device (CCD),  for which they have jointly received the Franklin Institute's Stuart Ballantine Medal in 1973, the 1974 IEEE Morris N. Liebmann Memorial Award, the 2006 Charles Stark Draper Prize, and the 2009 Nobel Prize in Physics.

Both Boyle and Smith were avid sailors who took many trips together.  After retirement Smith sailed around the world with his life partner, Janet, for seventeen years, eventually giving up his hobby in 2003 to "spare his 'creaky bones' from further storms". He currently resides in the Waretown section of Ocean Township, Ocean County, New Jersey.

In 2015, Smith was awarded the Progress Medal and Honorary Fellowship of the Royal Photographic Society. He is a member of Pi Mu Epsilon, Phi Beta Kappa, and Sigma Xi and a fellow of the Institute of Electrical and Electronics Engineers (IEEE) and American Physical Society and a member of the National Academy of Engineering.

In 2017, Smith was announced as one of four winners of the Queen Elizabeth Prize for Engineering, for his contribution to the creation of digital imaging sensors.

References

External links

Invention Hall of Fame Biography
Amateur Radio licensee
Interview in Czech TV December 2013  
 

1930 births
Living people
21st-century American physicists
American Nobel laureates
Members of the United States National Academy of Engineering
Nobel laureates in Physics
Draper Prize winners
People from Ocean Township, Ocean County, New Jersey
Scientists at Bell Labs
University of Pennsylvania alumni
University of Chicago alumni